Sylvia Dördelmann (born 7 April 1970 in Waltrop) is a German rower.

References 
 
 

1970 births
Living people
German female rowers
Rowers at the 1992 Summer Olympics
Olympic bronze medalists for Germany
Olympic rowers of Germany
Olympic medalists in rowing
World Rowing Championships medalists for West Germany
Medalists at the 1992 Summer Olympics
People from Recklinghausen (district)
Sportspeople from Münster (region)
20th-century German women